Browntown is a census-designated place (CDP) in Pittston Township, Luzerne County, Pennsylvania, United States, adjacent to Pittston City. The CDP population was 1,418 at the 2010 census.

Geography

Browntown is adjacent to the southeast border of Pittston City. The borough of Yatesville is to the south, and Hughestown is to the north. U.S. 11 passes through the northern part of the CDP.

References

Census-designated places in Luzerne County, Pennsylvania
Census-designated places in Pennsylvania